Oddusuddan is a town in the Mullaitivu District, Sri Lanka. In Tamil Oddu-suddan translates to 'roof-tile-making-place'. It is located nearly halfway between Maankulam and Mullaitivu on highway A34.

A Red clay factory is planned to be built as PPP project in the area to enhance the livelihood development in the area.

See also 

Oddusuddan offensive

References

Towns in Mullaitivu District
Oddusuddan DS Division